Johann Sebastian Bach composed the church cantata  (Ah Lord, poor sinner that I am), 135 in Leipzig for the third Sunday after Trinity and first performed it on 25 June 1724. It is the fourth chorale cantata from his second annual cycle, and is based on the hymn by Cyriakus Schneegass.

In the format of Bach's chorale cantata cycle, the words of the hymn are retained unchanged only in the outer movements, while an unknown contemporary librettist paraphrased the inner stanzas for recitatives and arias. Bach structured the cantata in six movements, setting the chorale tune in a chorale fantasia in the opening movement, and in a four-part setting in the closing movement. The two choral movements frame alternating recitatives and arias of three vocal soloists. Bach also used a four-part choir, and a Baroque instrumental ensemble of cornett, trombone, two oboes, strings and continuo. He set the first movement as a polyphonic chorale fantasia, the bass sings the cantus firmus.

History and words 
Bach took office as Thomaskantor, music director in Leipzig, end of May 1723. It was part of his duties to supply music for the Sundays and feast days of the liturgical year at four churches of the town, and he decided to compose new cantatas for these occasions. He began with a cantata for the first Sunday after Trinity in 1723, performed on 30 May, and wrote a series of church cantatas until Trinity of the next year, which became known as his first cantata cycle. The following year, he composed new cantatas for the occasions of the liturgical year, each based on one Lutheran chorale, an effort which became known later as his chorale cantata cycle.

Bach composed the cantata for the Third Sunday after Trinity as the fourth cantata of his second annual cycle, and first performed it on 25 June 1724, one day after , on St. John's Day.

The prescribed readings for the Sunday were from the First Epistle of Peter, "Cast thy burden upon the Lord", and from the Gospel of Luke, the parable of the Lost Sheep and the parable of the Lost Coin. The cantata is based entirely on the chorale "" (1597) by Cyriakus Schneegass, a paraphrase on Psalm 6 in six stanzas. The connection to the readings is rather marginal: the Lord's comforting (movement 3) and destruction of the enemies (movement 5) refer to the epistle, while the theme of the hymn, the joy about a repenting sinner, connects to the gospel. The unknown librettist retained the first and last stanza unchanged. He paraphrased the other four stanzas to four movements, for alternating recitatives and arias.

Music

Structure and scoring 
Bach structured the cantata in six movements. The first and last are set for choir as a chorale fantasia and a closing chorale. They frame alternating recitatives and arias with the text arranged by the librettist. Bach scored the work for three vocal soloists (alto (A), tenor (T) and bass (B)), a four-part choir, and a Baroque instrumental ensemble: cornett (Ct) to reinforce the soprano chorale tune in the last movement, trombone (Tb) to reinforce the bass chorale tune in the first movement, two oboes (Ob), two violins (Vl), viola (Va), and basso continuo (Bc). The duration of the cantata has been stated as 17 minutes.

In the following table of the movements, the scoring follows the Neue Bach-Ausgabe. The keys and time signatures are taken from the book by Bach scholar Alfred Dürr, using the symbols for common time (4/4) and alla breve (2/2). The instruments are shown separately for winds and strings, while the continuo, playing throughout, is not shown.

Structure 
The opening chorus is a chorale fantasia as in the previous chorale cantatas. Bach had started the first one of his second cycle with the cantus firmus of the chorale tune in the soprano, in this fourth work the bass has the honour. According to the Bach scholar Christoph Wolff, the first four cantatas of the cycle form a group, distinctively different in their chorale fantasias. After a French Overture, a motet and an Italian concerto, the movement is an "extraordinary filigree of vocal and instrumental counterpoint" of the chorale melody. All parts, even the instruments, take part in the polyphonic setting of the tune. Bach used the melody, originally a love song, later for the first chorale of his Christmas Oratorio, "", and several times in his St Matthew Passion, most prominently "". All eight lines of the text are first treated instrumentally, then vocally. The instrumental anticipation is a trio without continuo of oboe I and II against the strings, which play in unison the cantus firmus. In stark contrast to this high texture, the four-part vocal setting is dominated by the cantus firmus in the bass, reinforced by the trombone and the continuo. The strings play colla parte with the other voices. On the words "" (that I may live forever) the cantus firmus is broadened to three times as slow.

In the tenor recitative, "rushes of notes" illustrate the images of the repentant sinner's "tears, which, like rapid rivers, roll down my cheeks. My soul is anxious and fearful with terror". It is concluded by an original line from the chorale, "Ah, Lord, why so long?". In the tenor aria, accompanied by the two oboes, the "collapse in death" is pictured by falling sevenths, "silent in death" by long silences. The alto recitative opens with an original line of the chorale, "I am weary of sobbing", expressed in a variation of the first line of the tune. The bass aria is a vigorous call, "Hence, all you evildoers". The strings play a forceful two-bar phrase, repeated twice at lower pitches, at which point it soars upwards and becomes increasingly dispersive in nature. In Bach's Obituary, written by Carl Philipp Emanuel Bach and Agricola and published in 1754 mention is made of his distinctive melodies which are described as "strange" and "like no others". This is a good example; scrupulously shaped and crafted, ranging over nearly three octaves and carried forward through jagged shapes whilst radiating an unprecedented vigour and all the time reflecting the imagery of the text. The cantata closes with a four-part chorale, the soprano reinforced by the cornett.

Recordings 
The listing is taken from the selection on the Bach-Cantatas website.

 J. S. Bach: Cantatas BWV 29 & BWV 135, Wolfgang Gönnenwein, Süddeutscher Madrigalchor, Deutsche Bachsolisten, Emmy Lisken, Petre Munteanu, Johannes Hoefflin, Jakob Stämpfli, Cantate 1963
 Bach Cantatas Vol. 3 – Ascension Day, Whitsun, Trinity, Karl Richter, Münchener Bach-Chor, Münchener Bach-Orchester, Anna Reynolds, Peter Schreier, Dietrich Fischer-Dieskau, Archiv Produktion 1975
 Die Bach Kantate Vol. 40, Helmuth Rilling, Gächinger Kantorei, Bach-Collegium Stuttgart, Helen Watts, Adalbert Kraus, Philippe Huttenlocher, Hänssler 1979
 J. S. Bach: Das Kantatenwerk – Sacred Cantatas Vol. 7, Gustav Leonhardt, Knabenchor Hannover, Collegium Vocale Gent, Leonhardt-Consort, René Jacobs, Marius van Altena, Max van Egmond, Teldec 1983
 Bach Edition Vol. 2 – Cantatas Vol. 11, Pieter Jan Leusink, Holland Boys Choir, Netherlands Bach Collegium, Sytse Buwalda, Knut Schoch, Bas Ramselaar, Brilliant Classics 1999
 J. S. Bach: Complete Cantatas Vol. 12, Ton Koopman, Amsterdam Baroque Orchestra & Choir, Annette Markert, Christoph Prégardien, Klaus Mertens, Antoine Marchand 2000
 Bach Cantatas Vol. 2: Paris/Zürich / For the 2nd Sunday after Trinity / For the 3rd Sunday after Trinity, John Eliot Gardiner, Monteverdi Choir, English Baroque Soloists, Robin Tyson, Vernon Kirk, Jonathan Brown, Soli Deo Gloria 2000
 J. S. Bach: Cantatas Vol. 29 (Cantatas from Leipzig 1725), Masaaki Suzuki, Bach Collegium Japan, Pascal Bertin, Gerd Türk, Peter Kooy, BIS 2004
 J. S. Bach: Cantatas for the Complete Liturgical Year Vol. 2: "Wer nur den lieben Gott lässt walten" – Cantatas BWV 177 · 93 · 135, Sigiswald Kuijken, La Petite Bande, Siri Thornhill, Petra Noskaiová, Christoph Genz, Jan van der Crabben, Accent 2005

References

Bibliography

External links 
 
 BWV 135 Ach Herr, mich armen Sünder English translation, University of Vermont
 BWV 135 Ach Herr, mich armen Sünder text, scoring, University of Alberta
 Luke Dahn: BWV 135.6 bach-chorales.com
 Ach Herr, mich armen Sünder, BWV 135: performance by the Netherlands Bach Society (video and background information)

Church cantatas by Johann Sebastian Bach
Psalm-related compositions by Johann Sebastian Bach
1724 compositions